The army of Raymond of Saint-Gilles was one of the first to be formed after Pope Urban II called for the First Crusade.  Raymond formed a Provençal army and left his County of Toulouse in October 1096, traveling over the land route.  He was the only leader of a major army that did not swear an oath of fealty to Byzantine emperor Alexius I Komnenos.

The known members of the army, which numbered in the thousands, were almost all French and included the ones listed below, as reported in histories of the First Crusade.  Unless otherwise noted, references are to the on-line database of Riley-Smith, et al., and the hyperlinks therein provide details including original sources. The names below are also referenced in the Riley-Smith tome, Appendix I: Preliminary List of Crusaders.  Those references are not shown unless they appear elsewhere in the text of previously referenced book.  Articles that are hyperlinked to a more detailed article in this encyclopædia rely on the latter for references.

The Commander’s Household 

The known members of the Commanders’s household include the following:
 The Commander’s wife Elvira of Castile, daughter of Alfonso VI the Brave, King of León, and their son born and died on the journey. (See also Women in the Crusades.)
 The Standard-Bearer of the Commander was Heraclius I, Viscount of Polignac, related to Peter of Fay and was brother to Pons of Fay.  He died in the siege of Antioch on 9 July 1098
 Raymond of Vigeois, chamberlain to the Commander.

Clergy 

The members of the church traveling with the Commander included:
 Adhemar of Le Puy, Bishop of Puy-en-Velay, recognized as spiritual leader of the Crusade. He was brother of the knight William Hugh of Montei.
 Aicard, Archbishop of Arles (Achard of Marseilles)
 Richard, Cardinal of St. Victor of Marseilles
 Bernard of Valence, priest and chaplain of Adhemar of Le Puy, Bishop of Artah, patriarch of Antioch
 Aufan, Bishop of Apt
 Bertrand of Bas, priest and canon of Le Puy
 Bertrand (II) of Provence-Alpes-Côte-d'Azur and Bouches-du-Rhône, lay sacristan of the church in Arles
 Herbert, Chaplain of Chaise-Dieu and of the Commander, Bishop of Tripoli
 Peter I, Bishop of Glandèves
 Peter I of Narbone, promoted to Bishop of Albara during the Crusade. Peter’s position was the precursor to the office of the Latin Patriarchate of Antioch.
 Peter Desiderius, priest and chaplain of Isoard I of Die
 Pons of Grillon, chaplain of Raymond Decan, Lord of Posquières
 Raymond, Lord of Posquières, dean of the Church of St. Trophime in Arles and a follower of Pons of Griffon
 Simon, chaplain to the Commander
 Stephen of Valence, priest
 William, Bishop of Orange.

Historians 

Two of the clergy recorded the activities of the army and included:
 Peter Tudebode, a priest and author of Historia de Hierosolymitano itinere, a chronicle of the Crusade
 Raymond of Aguilers, priest and chaplain to Raymond of Saint-Gilles.  Chronicler of the Crusade in his Historia Francorum qui ceperunt Iherusalem.

Nobles 

The nobles and lords who fought with the Commander included:
 Achard, Castellan of Montmerle.  He was killed in an ambush during the siege of Jerusalem.
 Arved Tudebode, a relative of Peter Tudebone, who was killed at the siege of Antioch
 Bernard Ato IV, Viscount of Béziers and Carcassonne
 Béranger, Viscount of Narbonne
 Centule II, Count of Bigorre, half-brother of Gaston IV of Béarn
 Gaston IV, Viscount of Béarn
 Geldemar Carpenel, Lord of Haifa
 Girard I, Count of Roussillon (possible)
 Gouffier I, Lord of Lastours, Hautefort and Tarrason, related to a number of later Crusaders, and apparently brought a tamed lion back from the East
 Hugh, Lord of Salagnac
 Peter, Viscount of Castillon, sent by the Commander to try and secure Antioch before the arrival of his army
 Peter, Lord of Fay-Chapteuil, brother of Pons of Fay-Chapteuil and related to the Standard-Bearer Heraclius I, Viscount of Polignac. He was killed by imperial troops while crossing Byzantine territory.
 Pons, Lord of Blazon
 Pons II, Lord of Fay-le-Froid, brother of Peter of Fay-Chapteuil and a relative of Heraclius of Polignac. He, like his brother, was killed by imperial troops while crossing Byzantine territory.
 Pons, Lord of Mezenc, brother or half-brother of Peter the Bastard
 Raimbold II, Count of Orange
 Raymond I, Viscount of Turenne, brother-in-law to Rotrou III of Perche
 Rigaud IV, Lord of Tournemire, accompanied by an almoner
 Roger, Lord of Mirepoix
 Roman of Le Puy, later Lord of Transjordan
 William Peyre, Lord of Cunhlat, master of Peter Bartholomew
 William III, Count of Forez and Lyon
 William I, Lord of Sabran
 William II Jordan, Count of Berga and Cerdagne (Cendenya)
 William V, Count of Montpellier.

Knights and other Soldiers 

While many thousands of knights and other fighting men joined the army, the following were noted:
 Arnold Tudebode and his brother Arvedus (Arfan) Tudebod, both killed at the siege of Antioch.  They were brothers of Peter Tudebode the cleric and historian.
 Bernard Raymond of Béziers, likely the son of Bertrand II of Provence, the father-in-law of Bernard Ato IV
 Farald of Thouars
 Brothers Gerald, Raymond and Pons.  Little is known about the brothers except that they each donated their part of the tithes pertaining to the castle of Rocha Martina to the abbey of St. Victor of Marseilles.
 Isoard of Ganges, who distinguished himself at the siege of Antioch
 Isoard I, Count of Die,  a comrade of Peter Desiderius and under the command of Raymond Pilet d’d’alas
 Peter the Bastard, Lord of Mezenc, brother of First Crusaders Pons, Lord of Mezenc, and Guy and William (expedition unclear)
 Peter of Roaix
 Peter Bartholomew, was servant to William Peyre of Cunhla, and was sent as a messenger to the Turkish emir Kerbogha.  His vision of the Holy Lance led to his trial by fire. He was pulled from the fire by Raymond Pilet d’Alès, but subsequently died.
 Pons the Red, died shortly after returning from the Crusade
 Pons Rainard (Raynouard), died during the Crusade
 Raymond of Curemonte
 Raymond Pilet d’Alès, a well known knight
 Raymond Bertrand of l’Isle-Jourdan
 William Hugh of Monteil I, occupier of the Crusader castle Krak des Chavaliers, brother of Adhemar of Le Puy.

Major Battles 

The army of Raymond took part in most of the major battles in the First Crusade, including:
 Siege of Nicaea, 1097
 Battle of Dorylaeum, 1097
 Siege of Antioch, 1097–1098
 Capture of Krak des Chavaliers, 1099
 Battle of Ascalon, 1099.

He and his army also participated in the doomed Crusade of 1101.

Sources 

 Riley-Smith, Jonathan, The First Crusaders, 1095-1131, Cambridge University Press, London, 1997
 Runciman, Steven, A History of the Crusades, Volume One: The First Crusade and the Foundation of the Kingdom of Jerusalem, Cambridge University Press, London, 1951
 Bury, J. B., Editor, The Cambridge Medieval History, Volume III: Germany and the Western Empire, Cambridge University Press, London, 1922
 Prof. J. S. C. Riley-Smith, Prof, Jonathan Phillips, Dr. Alan V. Murray, Dr. Guy Perry, Dr. Nicholas Morton, A Database of Crusaders to the Holy Land, 1095-1149 (available on-line)
 Tudebode, Peter, Historia de Hierosolymitano itinere, John and Laurita Hill, Editors, Paris, 1977
 Raymond d'Aguilers, Historia Francorum qui ceperunt Iherusalem, John and Laurita Hill, Editors, Paris, 1969
 France, John, Victory in the East: A Military History of the First Crusade, Cambridge University Press, 1996 ( available on Internet Archive)

References 

Armies of the First Crusade
Christians of the First Crusade